Oloví is a town in Sokolov District in the Karlovy Vary Region of the Czech Republic. It has about 1,600 inhabitants.

Administrative parts
Villages of Hory, Nové Domy and Studenec are administrative parts of Oloví.

History
The first written mention of Oloví is from 1523. Since its foundation, lead and to a lesser extent silver were mined in the area, hence the town's name (lead = olovo in Czech).

From 1938 to 1945 it was one of the municipalities in Sudetenland.

Twin towns – sister cities

Oloví is twinned with:
 Kastl, Germany

References

External links

Cities and towns in the Czech Republic
Populated places in Sokolov District